Pulaski Park refers to a number of places named after Casimir Pulaski (Kazimierz Pułaski), a Polish military commander and American Revolutionary War hero.

Parks named in honor of Casimir Pulaski
 Pulaski Park (Chicago)
 Pulaski Park (Holyoke, Massachusetts)
 Pulaski Park (Northampton, Massachusetts)
 Pulaski Park (Fall River, Massachusetts), a Commemoration of Casimir Pulaski
 Pulaski State Park, a state park in Rhode Island
 Pulaski Park (Omaha)

 Pulaski Park (Pulaski, Virginia); see Canon de 155mm GPF
Fort Pulaski National Monument (National Park Service), an American Civil War military fort near Savannah, Georgia

Neighborhoods in the United States
 Pulaski Park, Chicago, Illinois
 Pulaski (Gary), a park in Gary, Indiana

See also
 Commemoration of Casimir Pulaski
 Pulaski Township (disambiguation)